Karen Anne Buljo (born July 1, 1964) is a Saami author, who has authored over 10 books on children's literature and young adult literature in the Northern Sami language.

References 

1964 births
Living people
Sámi-language writers
Norwegian writers